The 2014 Rio Open was a combined men's and women's professional tennis tournament played on outdoor clay courts. It was the inaugural edition of the tournament, and part of the 2014 ATP World Tour and the 2014 WTA Tour. It took place at the Jockey Club Brasileiro in Rio de Janeiro, Brazil between 17 February and 23 February 2014. Rafael Nadal and Kurumi Nara won the singles title.

Points and prize money

Point distribution

Prize money 

1 Qualifiers prize money is also the Round of 32 prize money
* per team

ATP singles main-draw entrants

Seeds 

 1 Rankings as of February 10, 2014.

Other entrants 
The following players received wildcards into the main draw:
  Thomaz Bellucci
  Guilherme Clezar
  João Souza

The following players received entry from the qualifying draw:
  Facundo Bagnis
  Aljaž Bedene
  Martin Kližan
  Dušan Lajović

Withdrawals 
Before the tournament
  Carlos Berlocq
During the tournament
  Martin Kližan (stomach pain)

Retirements 
  Filippo Volandri (shoulder injury)

ATP doubles main-draw entrants

Seeds 

 1 Rankings as of February 10, 2014.

Other entrants 
The following pairs received wildcards into the main draw:
  Marcelo Demoliner /  João Souza
  Juan Mónaco /  André Sá

The following pair received entry from the qualifying draw:
  Federico Delbonis /  Leonardo Mayer

WTA singles main-draw entrants

Seeds 

 1 Rankings as of February 10, 2014.

Other entrants 
The following players received wildcards into the main draw:
  Paula Cristina Gonçalves
  Beatriz Haddad Maia
  Laura Pigossi

The following players received entry from the qualifying draw:
  Irina-Camelia Begu
  Nastassja Burnett
  Verónica Cepede Royg
  Nicole Gibbs
  Danka Kovinić
  Alison Van Uytvanck

Withdrawals
Before the tournament
  Virginie Razzano --> replaced by Mariana Duque

Retirements
  Lourdes Domínguez Lino (left hamstring strain)

WTA doubles main-draw entrants

Seeds 

 1 Rankings as of February 10, 2014.

Other entrants 
The following pairs received wildcards into the main draw:
  Maria Fernanda Alves /  Beatriz Haddad Maia
  Paula Cristina Gonçalves /  Laura Pigossi

Withdrawals 
During the tournament
  Lourdes Domínguez Lino (left hamstring strain)

Finals

Men's singles 

  Rafael Nadal defeated  Alexandr Dolgopolov, 6–3, 7–6(7–3)

Women's singles 

  Kurumi Nara defeated   Klára Zakopalová, 6–1, 4–6, 6–1

Men's doubles 

  Juan Sebastián Cabal /  Robert Farah defeated   David Marrero /  Marcelo Melo, 6–4, 6–2

Women's doubles 

  Irina-Camelia Begu /  María Irigoyen defeated   Johanna Larsson /  Chanelle Scheepers, 6–2, 6–0

References

External links 
 Official website

Rio de Janeiro Open
Rio de Janeiro Open
2014
Rio Open